Jasmine Ser Xiang Wei (born 24 September 1990) is a Singaporean sports shooter. She competed in the Women's 10 metre air rifle and the 50 metre rifle 3 positions events at the 2012 Summer Olympics. More recently, she won gold in the 50 meter rifle 3 positions category with a Games record at the 2014 Commonwealth Games in Glasgow.  She previously won gold at the 2010 Commonwealth Games in the 10 air rifle, and silver in the 50 m rifle 3 positions and the 10 m air rifle pairs and the 50 m rifle pairs at the same Games.  She also competed at the 2016 Summer Olympics. When she won silver at the 2006 Asian Games in the 10 m team air rifle event, her sister, Adrienne Ser, was part of the team.

Ser juggled her university studies while competing internationally. She graduated from the National University of Singapore in 2014.

References

External links
 
 

1990 births
Living people
Singaporean female sport shooters
Olympic shooters of Singapore
Shooters at the 2012 Summer Olympics
Shooters at the 2016 Summer Olympics
Asian Games medalists in shooting
Asian Games silver medalists for Singapore
Shooters at the 2006 Asian Games
Shooters at the 2010 Asian Games
Shooters at the 2014 Asian Games
Shooters at the 2018 Asian Games
Medalists at the 2006 Asian Games
Commonwealth Games medallists in shooting
Commonwealth Games gold medallists for Singapore
Commonwealth Games silver medallists for Singapore
Shooters at the 2010 Commonwealth Games
Shooters at the 2014 Commonwealth Games
Southeast Asian Games gold medalists for Singapore
Southeast Asian Games silver medalists for Singapore
Southeast Asian Games bronze medalists for Singapore
Southeast Asian Games medalists in shooting
Competitors at the 2015 Southeast Asian Games
Competitors at the 2017 Southeast Asian Games
National University of Singapore alumni
Medallists at the 2010 Commonwealth Games
Medallists at the 2014 Commonwealth Games